Peter Maher (26 January 1872 – 18 November 1947) was an Irish hurler. He played hurling with his local clubs Clonoulty–Rossmore and Suir View and was a member of the Tipperary senior hurling team between 1895 and 1897.

Biography

After impressing at club level, Maher joined the Tipperary senior hurling team during the 1895 championship. He won an All-Ireland Championship medal that year after a defeat of Kilkenny in the final. Maher also won a Munster Championship medal that year.

Honours

Tipperary
All-Ireland Senior Hurling Championship (1): 1895
Munster Senior Hurling Championship (1): 1895

References

1872 births
1947 deaths
Clonoulty-Rossmore hurlers
Tipperary inter-county hurlers
All-Ireland Senior Hurling Championship winners